In architecture and joinery, the chambranle is the border, frame, or ornament, made of stone or wood, that is a component of the three sides round chamber doors, large windows, and chimneys.

When a chambranle is plain and without mouldings, it is called a band, case, or frame. The chambranle consists of three parts; the two sides, called montants, or ports, and the top, called the traverse or supercilium. The chambranle of an ordinary door is frequently called a doorcase; of a window, window frame; and of a chimney, manteltree.

History

In ancient architecture, antepagmenta were garnishings in posts or doors, wrought in stone or timber, or lintels of a window.  The word comes from Latin and has been borrowed in English to be used for the entire chambranle, i.e. the door case, or window frame.

References

 
 
 ANTEPAGMENTA, Ancient Library, p. 98

External links
Tips To Fix Condensation Between Double Pane Windows

Doors
Woodworking
Windows
Fireplaces